Events from the year 2005 in Sweden

Incumbents
 Monarch – Carl XVI Gustaf
 Prime Minister – Göran Persson

Events

Popular culture

Literature 
 The Girl with the Dragon Tattoo, crime novel by Stieg Larsson
 The Stone Cutter, crime novel by Camilla Läckberg
 Det lysande ögat, children's detective fiction

Film
 4 November – Mother of Mine, directed by Klaus Härö, released in Sweden 
 11 November – Made in YU released 
 18 November – Storm released

Deaths

 8 February – Germund Dahlquist, mathematician (born 1925)
 13 February – Sixten Ehrling, conductor (born 1918)
 12 May – Monica Zetterlund, singer and actress (born 1937)
 28 November – Carl Forssell, fencer (born 1917).

Full date missing 
 Anna Westberg, novelist and non-fiction writer (born 1946).

See also
 2005 in Swedish television

References

 
Years of the 21st century in Sweden